
Year 678 (DCLXXVIII) was a common year starting on Friday (link will display the full calendar) of the Julian calendar. The denomination 678 for this year has been used since the early medieval period, when the Anno Domini calendar era became the prevalent method in Europe for naming years.

Events 
 By place 

 Byzantine Empire 
 July 27 – The Siege of Thessalonica (676–678) ends, when the Sclaveni withdraw.
 Autumn – Siege of Constantinople: Emperor Constantine IV confronts the Arab besiegers in a head-on engagement. The Byzantine fleet, equipped with Greek fire, destroys the Muslim fleet at Sillyon, ending the Arab threat to Europe, and forcing Yazid (a son of caliph Muawiyah I) to lift the siege on land and sea. The victory also frees up forces that are sent to raise the two-year siege of Thessalonica by the local Slavic tribes.

 Britain 
 King Æthelred of Mercia defeats the Northumbrian forces under King Ecgfrith, in a battle near the River Trent. Archbishop Theodore helps to resolve differences between the two, Æthelred agreeing to pay a weregild to avoid any resumption of hostilities (approximate date).

 Japan 
 April 27 – Emperor Tenmu holds divination for the purpose of proceeding to the Abstinence Palace. 
 May 3 – Princess Tōchi suddenly takes ill and dies within the palace. Tenmu, her father, is unable to sacrifice to the Gods of Heaven and Earth.
 May 10 – Tōchi is buried at a place which could be Akō (Hyōgo Prefecture). Tenmu is graciously pleased to raise lament for her.

 By topic 

 Religion 
 Wilfrid, bishop of York, is at the height of his power and owns vast estates throughout Northumbria. After his refusal to agree to a division of his see, Ecgfrith and Theodore, archbishop of Canterbury, have him banished from Northumbria.
 April 11 – Pope Donus dies at Rome, after a reign of 1 year and 160 days. He is succeeded by Agatho I, who becomes the 79th pope. He is the first pope to stop paying tribute to Emperor Constantine IV upon election.
 In Japan, the national worshiping to the Gods of Heaven and Earth is planned. Tenmu tries to select his daughter Tōchi as a Saiō to make her serve the Gods. However, Tōchi suddenly takes ill and dies.
 The Beomeosa temple complex in Geumjeong-gu (modern South Korea) is constructed, during the reign of King Munmu of Silla.

Births 
 Childebert III, Merovingian Frankish king and son of Theuderic III
 Childebrand I, duke of Burgundy (d. 751)
 K'inich Ahkal Mo' Naab' III, Maya ruler of Palenque

Deaths 
 April 11 – Pope Donus
 May 3 – Tōchi, Japanese princess
 Abdullah ibn Aamir, Arab general (b. 626)
 Ælfwine, king of Deira (approximate date)
 Aisha, wife of Muhammad
 Arbogast, bishop of Strasbourg
 Nathalan, Scottish bishop
 Wechtar, Lombard duke of Friuli
 Zhang Wenguan, chancellor of the Tang dynasty (b. 606)

References

Sources